The 2015 TAC Cup season was the 24th season of the TAC Cup competition. Oakleigh Chargers won to claim the club's fourth premiership win while defeating the Eastern Ranges in the grand final by 12 points.

Ladder

Grand Final

References

NAB League
Nab League